Midnight Soul Serenade is an album by Heavy Trash, released in 2009.

It contains a cover of "Bumble Bee," written by LaVern Baker.

Track list 
All songs written and composed by Jon Spencer and Matt Verta-Ray except where noted.

References 

2009 albums
Heavy Trash albums